Ten Notes on a Summer's Day is the final studio album by the English punk rock group Crass, though members of the group subsequently collaborated and recorded under other names. It was released in 1986 and consists of a vocal and instrumental version of the same tracks in an avant-garde musical style.

The album was remastered and re-released as the sixth and final part of the Crassical Collection. The version of track 1 on the Crassical Collection CD has the opening notes from the instrumental version dubbed over the "What happened to Crass?" speech at the beginning of the vocal mix. The vocal mix also seamlessly fades into the Instrumental mix.

Track list

References 

Crass Records albums
Crass albums
1985 albums